Club Balonmán Cangas Frigoríficos Morrazo is a team of handball based in Cangas, Spain. It plays in Liga ASOBAL.

History

The team, founded in 1961, reached the Spanish first division, Liga ASOBAL, for the first time in 1995. It was there without interruption until 2006. The club made two appearances in Europe's number two cup, the EHF Cup, in the 2005/06 and 2015/16 seasons.

Sports Hall information

Name: – Pabellón Municipal O Gatañal
City: – Cangas
Capacity: – 2500
Address: – Carretera Cangas - Aldan, s/n, 36940, Cangas, Spain

Team

Current squad 

Squad for the 2022–23 season

Technical staff
 Head coach:  Nacho Moyano
 Assistant coach:  Felipe Verde
 Fitness coach:  Cuco Rodríguez
 Physiotherapist:  Serxio Lemos
 Club Doctor:  Manuel Caeiro

Transfers

Transfers for the 2022–23 season

Joining 
  Juan del Arco (CB) from  Helvetia Anaitasuna
  Mario Dorado (LW) from  BM Logroño La Rioja
  Gabriel Chaparro (LP) from  Atlético Novás
  Rares-Marian Fodorean (LB) from  Póvoa Andebol Clube
  Rajmond Tóth (CB) from  Budakalász FKC

Leaving 
  Daniel Fernández (LW) to  TVB 1898 Stuttgart
  Carles Asensio (LP) to  GWD Minden
  David Iglesias Estévez (LB) to  Limoges Handball
  Adrián Menduiña (RW) (retires)

Previous Squads

Season by season
{|
|valign="top" width=0%|

European competition

EHF Cup: It was formerly known as the IHF Cup until 1993. Also, starting from the 2012–13 season the competition has been merged with the EHF Cup Winners' Cup. The competition will be known as the EHF European League from the 2020–21 season.

As of 30 September 2022:

Participations in EHF Cup: 2x

EHF ranking

Former club members

Notable former players

  Juan Francisco Alemany (1999–2001)
  Vicente Álamo (2000–2002)
  Marc Amargant (2005–2006)
  Juan del Arco (2022–)
  Daniel Fernández (2020–2022)
  Rubén Garabaya (1999–2001)
  Yeray Lamariano (2015–2016)
  Antonio Ugalde (2003–2005, 2009–2011)
  Mare Hojc (2006–2007)
  Patricio Martínez Chávez (2004-2005)
  Marco Oneto (2002–2005)
  Venio Losert (2005–2006)
  Kasper Hvidt (1997-1998)
  Frédéric Louis (2007–2008)
  Bruno Martini (1998–1999)
  Seufyann Sayad (2006–2007)
  Kim Sung-Heon (2002–2003)
  Marko Lasica (2010–2013)
  Mile Mijušković (2013–2015)
  Alen Muratović (2003–2005, 2013–2021)
  Gojko Vučinić (2001)
  Filip Vujović (2016–2020)
  Miguel Baptista (2020–2021)
  Nenad Bilbija (2005–2006)
  Borut Oslak (2008–2010)
  Tihomir Doder (2005–2006, 2007–2011, 2019–2020)
  Jovan Kovačević (1998–1999)
  Stanislav Demovič (1999-2000)
  Oleksandr Hladun (1997)
  Máximo Cancio (2017–2019)
  Gabriel Chaparro (2022–)
  Eduardo Salazar (2013-2018)

Former coaches

References

External links
 
 

Sports teams in Galicia (Spain)
Spanish handball clubs
Handball clubs established in 1961
Liga ASOBAL teams
Province of Pontevedra